The 2002 congressional elections in Arizona were elections for Arizona's delegation to the United States House of Representatives, which occurred along with congressional elections nationwide on November 5, 2002. Arizona has eight seats, as apportioned during the 2000 United States Census and thus gaining two since the previous election.  Democrats and Republicans each gained a seat as result, with Republicans having six seats and Democrats having two seats.

Overview

References

2002
2002 Arizona elections
Arizona